Ksente Bogoev (Macedonian: Ксенте Богоев; born 20 October 1919 in Leunovo; died 20. April 2008 in Skopje) was a prominent economist, professor and Prime Minister of the Socialist Republic of Macedonia within the former Yugoslavia and Head of the National Bank of Yugoslavia in 1977. He was a member and chairman (1992–1997) of the Macedonian Academy of Sciences and Arts.

Prime Ministers of North Macedonia
Yugoslav politicians
Governors of the National Bank of Yugoslavia
Socialist Republic of Macedonia
1919 births
2008 deaths
Yugoslav economists